The data values of standard electrode potentials (E°) are given in the table below, in volts relative to the standard hydrogen electrode, and are for the following conditions:
 An effective concentration of 1 mol/L for each aqueous species or a species in a mercury amalgam (an alloy of mercury with another metal).
 A partial pressure of 101.325 kPa (absolute) (1 atm, 1.01325 bar) for each gaseous reagent. This pressure is used because most literature data are still given for this value (1 atm) rather than for the current standard of 100 kPa (1 bar) presently considered in the standard state.
 An activity of unity for each pure solid, pure liquid, or for water (solvent). The relation in electrode potential of metals in saltwater (as electrolyte) is given in the galvanic series.
 Although many of the half cells are written for multiple-electron transfers, the tabulated potentials are for a single-electron transfer. All of the reactions should be divided by the stoichiometric coefficient for the electron to get the corresponding corrected reaction equation. For example, the equation   Fe + 2  Fe(s)   (–0.44 V) means that it requires  2 × 0.44 eV = 0.88 eV of energy to be absorbed (hence the minus sign) in order to create one neutral atom of Fe(s) from one  Fe ion and two electrons, or 0.44 eV per electron, which is 0.44 J/C of electrons, which is 0.44 V.
 After dividing by the number of electrons, the standard potential E° is related to the standard Gibbs free energy of formation ΔGf° by:  where F is the Faraday constant.

The Nernst equation will then give potentials at concentrations, pressures, and temperatures other than standard.

 Note that the table may lack consistency due to data from different sources. For example:

{|
|-
|  ||+    |||| Cu(s) || ( = +0.520 V)
|-
|Cu ||+ 2|||| Cu(s) || ( = +0.337 V)
|-
|Cu ||+    ||||    || ( = +0.159 V)
|}



Table of standard electrode potentials
Legend: (s) – solid; (l) – liquid; (g) – gas; (aq) – aqueous (default for all charged species); (Hg) – amalgam; bold – water electrolysis equations.

See also 
 Standard apparent reduction potentials in biochemistry at pH 7
 Standard state

Notes

References

External links
 
 
 
 
 http://www.jesuitnola.org/upload/clark/Refs/red_pot.htm 
 https://web.archive.org/web/20150924015049/http://www.fptl.ru/biblioteka/spravo4niki/handbook-of-Chemistry-and-Physics.pdf
 http://hyperphysics.phy-astr.gsu.edu/Hbase/tables/electpot.html#c1

Electrochemistry
Electrochemical potentials
Chemistry-related lists